Daniel Alan Sumner is an American economist, currently the Frank H. Buck, Jr. Distinguished Professor and Director of the University of California, Agricultural Issues Center at University of California, Davis. He is also a publisher author.

References

Living people
Year of birth missing (living people)
University of California, Davis faculty
American non-fiction writers
University of Chicago alumni
California Polytechnic State University alumni
North Carolina State University faculty
Michigan State University alumni
21st-century American economists